Juan Muñoz Muñoz (born 12 November 1995) is a Spanish footballer who plays for CD Leganés as a forward.

Club career
Born in Utrera, Province of Seville, Andalusia, Muñoz graduated from Sevilla FC's youth system. He made his senior debut with the reserves in the 2013–14 season, in Segunda División B.

On 15 February 2014, Muñoz extended his contract with the club, running until 2016. On 13 July, he was called up by first-team manager Unai Emery for the preseason, and scored a goal against Eintracht Braunschweig late in the month.

On 3 December 2014, Muñoz made his competitive debut with the main squad, coming on as a substitute for Kevin Gameiro in the 75th minute of a 5–1 home rout of CE Sabadell FC in the round of 32 of the Copa del Rey. On 8 February of the following year, again from the bench, he first appeared in La Liga, in a 2–1 loss at Getafe CF.

Muñoz signed a new deal with Sevilla on 4 January 2016, renewing until 2019 and being definitely promoted to the first team. He scored his first professional goal 24 days later, contributing to the 3–0 away victory over CD Mirandés in the quarter-finals of the domestic cup (5–0 aggregate). His first goal in the top flight came on the last day of the season, a consolation in a 3–1 defeat at Athletic Bilbao.

On 31 August 2016, Muñoz was loaned to Segunda División side Real Zaragoza in a season-long move. The following 24 January, he joined fellow league team Levante UD also in a temporary deal.

On 8 August 2017, Muñoz was loaned to UD Almería for the upcoming campaign. On 1 July 2018, he cut ties with Sevilla and signed a two-year contract with second-tier AD Alcorcón on 28 July.

Muñoz agreed to a four-year deal at CD Leganés of the top division in June 2019, but returned to Almería on 2 September on loan.

References

External links

1995 births
Living people
People from Utrera
Sportspeople from the Province of Seville
Spanish footballers
Footballers from Andalusia
Association football forwards
La Liga players
Segunda División players
Segunda División B players
Sevilla Atlético players
Sevilla FC players
Real Zaragoza players
Levante UD footballers
UD Almería players
AD Alcorcón footballers
CD Leganés players
Spain youth international footballers